Olomouc (or Iuliomontium) is a city in the Czech Republic. It has about 99,000 inhabitants, and its larger urban zone has a population of about 384,000 inhabitants (2019).

Located on the Morava River, the city is the ecclesiastical metropolis and was a historical capital city of Moravia, before having been sacked by the Swedish army during the Thirty Years' War. Today, it is the administrative centre of the Olomouc Region and the sixth largest city in the Czech Republic. The historic city centre is well preserved and is protected by law as urban monument reservation. The Holy Trinity Column was listed as a UNESCO World Heritage Site in 2000 for its quintessential Baroque style and symbolic value.

Administrative division
Olomouc is made up of 26 administrative parts:

Olomouc
Bělidla
Černovír
Chomoutov
Chválkovice
Droždín
Hejčín
Hodolany
Holice
Klášterní Hradisko
Lazce
Lošov
Nedvězí
Nemilany
Neředín
Nová Ulice
Nové Sady
Nový Svět
Pavlovičky
Povel
Radíkov
Řepčín
Slavonín
Svatý Kopeček
Topolany
Týneček

History

Ancient history
Olomouc is said to occupy the site of a Roman fort founded in the imperial period, the original name of which, Iuliomontium (Mount Julius), would be gradually changed to the present form. Although this account is not documented except as oral history, archaeological excavations close to the city have revealed the remains of a Roman military camp dating from the time of the Marcomannic Wars of the late 2nd century.

Middle Ages
During the 6th century, Slavs migrated into the area. As early as the 7th century, a centre of political power developed in the present-day quarter of Povel (in lowland, south of the city centre). Around 810 the local Slavonic ruler was defeated by troops of Great Moravian rulers and the settlement in Olomouc-Povel was destroyed.

A new centre, where the Great Moravian governor resided, developed at the gord at Předhradí, a quarter of the inner city (the eastern, smaller part of the medieval centre). This settlement survived the defeat of the Great Moravia (c. 907) and gradually became the capital of the province of Moravia.

Around 981–990, the Polish Duke Mieszko I took the Moravian Gate and Olomouc as an important place at the intersection of trade routes. Olomouc probably was mentioned in the Dagome iudex document (ca 991) as Alemura. All of Moravia was part of Poland between 1003 and 1031 during the reign of Bolesław I the Brave and partly Mieszko II Lambert. The first certain mention of the city dates back to 1017. Moravia was under Bohemian rule since 1031 (according to some Czech historians, since 1019 or 1021).

The bishopric of Olomouc was founded in 1063. It was possibly re-founded because there are some unclear references to bishops of Moravia in the 10th century—if they were not only missionary bishops, but representatives of some remains of regular church organization, then it is very likely that these bishops had their seat in Olomouc. Centuries later in 1777, it was raised to the rank of an archbishopric. The bishopric was moved from the church of St. Peter (since destroyed) to the church of Saint Wenceslas in 1141 (the date is still disputed, other suggestions are 1131, 1134) under bishop Jindřich Zdík. The bishop's palace was built in the Romanesque architectural style. The bishopric acquired large tracts of land, especially in northern Moravia, and was one of the richest in the area.

Olomouc became one of the most important settlements in Moravia and a seat of the Přemyslid government and one of the appanage princes. In 1306 King Wenceslas III stopped here on his way to Poland. He was going to fight Władysław I the Elbow-high to claim his rights to the Polish crown and was assassinated.  With his death, the whole Přemyslid dynasty died out.

The city was officially founded in the mid-13th century and became one of the most important trade and power centres in the region. In the Middle Ages, it was the biggest town in Moravia and competed with Brno for the position of capital. Olomouc finally lost after the Swedes took the city and held it for eight years (1642–1650).

In 1235, the Mongols launched an invasion of Europe. After the Battle of Legnica in Poland, the Mongols carried their raids into Moravia, but were defensively defeated at the fortified town of Olomouc. The Mongols subsequently invaded and defeated Hungary.

In 1454 the city expelled its Jewish population as part of a wave of anti-Semitism, also seen in Spain and Portugal. The second half of the 15th century is considered the start of Olomouc's golden age. It hosted several royal meetings, and Matthias Corvinus was elected here as King of Bohemia (in fact anti-king) by the estates in 1469. In 1479 two kings of Bohemia (Vladislaus II and Matthias Corvinus) met here and concluded an agreement (Peace of Olomouc of 1479) for splitting the country.

Modern

Participating in the Protestant Reformation, Moravia became mostly Protestant. During the Thirty Years' War, in 1640 Olomouc was occupied by the Swedes for eight years. They left the city in ruins, and as a result it lost its predominant place in Moravia, becoming second to Brno.

In 1740 the town was captured and briefly held by the Prussians. Olomouc was fortified by Maria Theresa during the wars with Frederick the Great, who besieged the city unsuccessfully for seven weeks in 1758. In 1848 Olomouc was the scene of the emperor Ferdinand's abdication. Two years later, Austrian and German statesmen held a conference here called the Punctation of Olmütz. At the conference, they agreed to restore the German Confederation and Prussia accepted leadership by the Austrians.

In 1746 the first learned society in the lands under control of the Austrian Habsburgs, the Societas eruditorum incognitorum in terris Austriacis, was founded in Olomouc to spread Enlightenment ideas. Its monthly Monatliche Auszüge was the first scientific journal published in the Habsburg empire.

Largely because of its ecclesiastical links to Austria, Salzburg in particular, the city was influenced by German culture since the Middle Ages. Demographics before censuses can only be interpreted from other documents. The town's ecclesiastical constitution, the meetings of the Diet and the locally printed hymnal, were recorded in Czech in the mid-16th and 17th centuries. The first treatise on music in Czech was published in Olomouc in the mid-16th century. The political and social changes that followed the Thirty Years' War increased the influence of courtly Habsburg and Austrian/German-language culture. The "Germanification" of the town likely resulted from the cosmopolitan nature of the city; as the cultural, administrative and religious centre of the region, it drew officials, musicians and traders from all over Europe.

Despite these influences, Czech dominated, particularly in ecclesiastical publications throughout the 17th and 18th centuries. When the Austrian-born composer and musician Philip J. Rittler accepted a post at the Wenceslas Cathedral in the latter 17th century, he felt it necessary to learn Czech. With the continued dominance of the Habsburgs and migration of ethnic Germans into the area, the use of Czech declined. By the 19th century, the number of ethnic Germans in the city were recorded as three times higher than the number of Czechs.

After the 1848 revolution, the government rescinded its Jewish expulsion order of 1454. Jews returned to the city and, in 1897, built a synagogue. The Jewish population reached 1,676 in 1900.

Olomouc retained its defensive city walls almost until the end of the 19th century. This suited the city council, because demolishing the walls would have allowed for expansion of the city and attracted more Czechs from neighbouring villages. The city council preferred Olomouc to be smaller and predominantly German. Greater expansion came after World War I and the establishment of Czechoslovakia. In 1919 Olomouc annexed two neighbouring towns and 11 surrounding villages, gaining new space for additional growth and development.

Serious tensions arose between ethnic Czechs and Germans during both world wars. During World War II, the city was under German occupation and most of the city's ethnic German residents sided with the Nazis; the German-run city council renamed the main square (until then named after president T. G. Masaryk) after Adolf Hitler. World War II brought a rise in anti-semitism and attacks on the Jews that reflected what was happening in Germany. On Kristallnacht (10 November 1938), townspeople destroyed the synagogue. In March 1939, city police arrested 800 Jewish men, and had some deported to the Dachau concentration camp. During 1942–1943, ethnic Germans sent the remaining Jews to Theresienstadt and other German concentration camps in occupied Poland. Fewer than 300 of the city's Jews survived the Holocaust. The Germans also established and operated a Gestapo prison in the city, and a forced labour camp in the Chválkovice district.

After Olomouc was liberated, Czech residents took back the original name of the city square. When the retreating German army passed through the city in the final weeks of the war, they shot at its 15th-century astronomical clock, leaving only a few pieces intact (these are held in the local museum). The city was restored to Czechoslovakia, although with a Soviet-installed communist regime with stayed in power until the Fall of Communism in the 1980s. In the 1950s, the clock was reconstructed under the influence of Soviet government; it features a procession of proletarians rather than saints. After the war, the government participated in the expulsion of ethnic Germans from the country, following the Allied leaders' Potsdam Agreement, which redefined the Central European borders, although many of these people's families had lived for two centuries in the region. There were the statue of the first president T. G. Masaryk reconstructed as a symbol of come back of democracy on Masaryk street after "velvet revolution" in 1990. Its inner city is the third-largest urban monument reservation in the country, after Prague.

Demographics

Transport

Public transport in Olomouc is provided by trams and buses. Local railway services from Olomouc main railway station to Senice na Hané and Prostějov make stops around the city.

The first train arrived in Olomouc on 17 October 1841 from Vienna. In 1845, the first omnibuses connected the railway station and the center of Olomouc. In 1899, omnibuses were replaced with trams.

The main railway station in Olomouc (Olomouc hlavní nádraží, or Olomouc hl.n) is an important railway junction. The city is connected with Prague, Ostrava, Brno, Zlín and Břeclav. The main train station in Olomouc is quite busy; passenger trains of all categories operated by České dráhy, RegioJet and LEO Express make stops there.

Culture
The city is the home of the Moravian Theatre (Moravské divadlo) and the Moravian Philharmonic (Moravská filharmonie). Olomouc is also the centre of the ethnographic region of Haná.

Education

Palacký University, the oldest in Moravia and second oldest in the Czech Republic, was founded in 1573 as part of an effort to reestablish Roman Catholicism in the country. At the time, roughly nine out of ten inhabitants of the Czech Crown lands were Protestants. Most of its faculties were suppressed in the 1850s by the Habsburg régime in retaliation for professor and student support for the 1848 revolution and the Czech National Revival. The university was fully restored in 1946; it was renamed Palacký University of Olomouc.

The university plays a very important role in the life of the city: with over 25,200 students (including those at Moravian College Olomouc), Olomouc has the highest density of university students in Central Europe. Many of the city's services are student-oriented. They close during holidays and the university exam periods. During the summer holiday, the trams run solo (apart from rush-hours), while during the university sessions, the lines are served by two coupled trams.

The university buildings comprise about a third of the city's heritage centre; notable ones include the University Art Centre and the so-called Armoury (now Central Library).

Sport

 AK Olomouc – athletics club
 Skokani Olomouc – baseball club
 1. HFK Olomouc – football club
 SK Sigma Olomouc – football club
 DHK Olomouc – women's handball club
 HC Olomouc – ice hockey club
 VK UP Olomouc – women's volleyball club
 RC Olomouc – rugby club

Sights

Olomouc contains several large squares, the chief of which is adorned with the Holy Trinity Column, designated as a UNESCO World Heritage Site.

The city has numerous historic religious buildings. The most prominent church is Saint Wenceslas Cathedral founded before 1107 in the compound of the Olomouc Castle. At the end of the 19th century, the cathedral was rebuilt in the neo-Gothic style. It kept many features of the original church, which had renovations and additions reflecting styles of different ages: Romanesque crypt, Gothic cloister, Baroque chapels. The church is next to the Bishop Zdík's Palace (also called the Přemyslid Palace), a Romanesque building built after 1141 by the bishop Jindřich Zdík. It remains one of the most precious monuments of Olomouc: Such an early bishop's palace is unique in Central Europe. The Přemyslid Palace, used as the residence of Olomouc dukes from the governing Přemyslid dynasty, stood nearby.

Church of Saint Maurice, a fine Gothic building of the 15th century, has the 6th-largest church organ in Central Europe.

Church of Saint Michael is notable. The Neo-baroque Chapel of Saint John Sarkander stands on the site of a former town prison. At the beginning of the Thirty Years' War, the Catholic priest John Sarkander was imprisoned here. Accused of collaboration with the enemy, he was tortured but did not reveal anything because of the Seal of Confession and died. The torture rack and Sarkander's gravestone are preserved here. He was canonized by Pope John Paul II during his visit in Olomouc in 1995.

John Paul II also visited  ("The Holy Hillock"), which has the magnificent Baroque Church of the Visitation of the Virgin Mary. It overlooks the city. The Pope promoted the church to Minor Basilica. Several monasteries are in Olomouc, including Hradisko Monastery, Convent of Dominican Sisters in Olomouc and others.

This monument commemorates 1,188 Yugoslav soldiers who died during World War I in local hospitals after being wounded on battlefields.

The principal secular building is the city hall, completed in the 15th century. It is flanked on one side by a gothic chapel, now adapted and operated as the Olomouc Museum of Art. The original 15th-century clock was destroyed at the end of World War II. It was reconstructed in 1947–1955 by Karel Svolinský, who used the government-approved style of the time, featuring proletarians rather than saints. This is also the reason why the clock's calendar represents some of the most important days of the Communist regime.

Olomouc has unique set of six Baroque fountains. They survived in such number thanks to the city council's caution. While most European cities were removing old fountains after building water-supply piping, Olomouc decided to keep them as reservoirs in case of fire. The fountains feature ancient Roman motifs; five portray the Roman gods Jupiter (image), Mercury (image), Triton (image), Neptune and Hercules (image). One features Julius Caesar, the legendary founder of the city (image). In the 21st century, an Arion fountain was added to the main square, inspired by the older project.

In front of the astronomical clock on the Horní ("Upper") Square, which is the largest square in Olomouc, is a scale model of the entire old town in bronze.

In popular culture
Asteroid 30564 Olomouc was named after this city.
Scenes from the 2002 television serial Doctor Zhivago were filmed in Olomouc.
Petra from the series Jane the Virgin is shown to be from here in flashback scenes
Olomouc is mentioned in the song "Disappear" by R.E.M. from the album Reveal.

Notable people

Public service 
Francis Taaffe, 4th Viscount Taaffe (1639–1704), Irish nobleman and officer; studied at the University of Olomouc
Joseph von Petrasch (1714–1772), soldier, writer and philologist; lived here from 1758
Anton Schubirz von Chobinin (1748–1801), General-major fought for Habsburg Austria against Ottoman Turkey
Anton Schindler (1795–1864), secretary and early biographer of Ludwig van Beethoven
Alexander Freiherr von Krobatin (1849–1933), Austrian Field Marshal Imperial Minister for War in 1912–1917
Hermann Hiltl (1872–1930), Austrian army officer
Paul Engelmann (1891–1965), architect
Zdeněk Fierlinger (1891–1976), diplomat and politician, served as the Prime Minister of Czechoslovakia in 1944–1946
Franz Karmasin (1901–1970), ethnic German politician in Czechoslovakia and SS Officer, helped found the Carpathian German Party
Jaroslav Otruba (1916–2007), architect, urban planner, designer and artist
Jiří Pelikán (1923–1999), journalist and politician
Pavel Dostál (1943–2005), Minister of Culture in 1998–2005
Franz Josef Wagner (born 1943), German journalist
Jiří Paroubek (born 1952), politician and Prime Minister in 2005–2006
Ivan Langer (born 1967), politician

The church
Augustinus Olomucensis (1467–1513), humanist and theologian
Charles Joseph of Lorraine (1680–1715) prelate, known as Charles III as Bishop of Olomouc
Archduke Rudolf of Austria (1788–1831), consecrated as Archbishop of Olomouc in 1819 
Franziskus von Sales Bauer (1841–1915), Cardinal of the Roman Catholic Church and Archbishop of Olomouc from 1904
Berthold Oppenheim (1867–1942), the rabbi of Olomouc in 1892–1939
John M. Oesterreicher (1904–1993), Roman Catholic theologian and a leading advocate of Jewish–Catholic reconciliation
Jan Graubner (born 1948), Roman Catholic archbishop of Olomouc from 1992

Science and academia
Valentin Stansel (1621–1705), Jesuit and astronomer who worked in Brazil
Karel Ferdinand Irmler (1650–?), lawyer and the first professor of secular law at University of Olomouc
Josef Vratislav Monse (1733–1793), lawyer, historian and professor of law, Rector at the University of Olomouc in 1780
Anton Schrötter von Kristelli (1802–1875), chemist and mineralogist
Rudolf Eitelberger von Edelberg (1817–1885), art historian and founder of the Vienna School of Art History
Ludwig Karl Schmarda (1819–1908), Austrian naturalist and traveller
Berthold Hatschek (1854–1941), Austrian zoologist
Olga Taussky-Todd (1906–1995), Austrian and later Czech-American mathematician
Jan G. Švec (born 1966), voice scientist, invented videokymography, used for diagnosis of voice disorders
Jaroslav Miller (born 1971), professor of history and rector at Palacký University
Tomáš Hudeček (born 1979), university professor and politician

The arts

Hildebert and Everwin (c. 1140), 12th-century illuminators in the scriptorium of Bishop Jindřich Zdík
Georg Flegel (1566–1638) German painter
Gottfried Finger (1655/6–1730), composer
Joseph Ignatz Sadler (1725–1767), painter
Cajetan Tschink (1763–1813), Austrian writer; worked and taught here
Hans Balatka (1827–1899) American conductor and composer
Adolf Hölzel (1853–1934), painter
Leo Fall (1873–1925), Austrian composer of operettas
Adolf Kašpar (1877–1934), painter and illustrator
Erma Zarska (1889–1971), opera singer
Egon Kornauth (1891–1959), Austrian composer and music teacher
Edgar G. Ulmer (1904–1972), Austrian-American film director
Peter Schmidl (born 1942), clarinetist
Emil Viklický (born 1948), jazz pianist and composer
Lenka Procházková (born 1951), novelist, signed Charter 77
Vladimír Havlík (born 1959), action artist, painter and pedagogue
Pavel Vítek (born 1962), singer, actor and pop star
Rostislav Čtvrtlík (1963–2011), stage, television and voice actor
Zora Vesecká (born 1967), child actress
Veronika Vařeková (born 1977), Sports Illustrated model

Sport

Evžen Rošický (1914–1942), athlete, journalist and resistance fighter
Karel Brückner (born 1939), football coach
Jiří Kavan (1943–2010), handball player
Martin Kotůlek (born 1969), football player and manager
David Prinosil (born 1973), tennis player
Radim Kořínek (born 1973), cyclist
Josef Karas (born 1978), decathlete and beauty pageant titleholder
František Huf (born 1981), bodybuilder and model
Jiří Hudler (born 1984), ice hockey player
Karlos Vemola (born 1985), mixed martial artist, bodybuilder and Greco-Roman wrestler
Tomáš Kalas (born 1993), footballer
Václav Jemelka (born 1995) footballer
Karolína Muchová (born 1996), tennis player
David Zima, (born 2000), footballer

Mayors
List of Olomouc mayors:

 1851–1865 Franz Kreilm
 1865–1866 Franz Hein
 1866–1872 Karl Borom. Johann Nep. Alois Schrötter
 1872–1896 Josef von Engel
 1896–1918 Karl Brandhuber
 1918–1919 government commissioner
 1919–1923 Karel Mareš
 1923–1939 Richard Fischer
 1939–1941 Fritz Czermak
 1942–1945 Julius Schreitter
 1945–1947 Václav Stibor-Kladenský
 1947–1949 Jan Kučera
 1949–1950 Ladislav Bernatský
 1950–1956 Antonín Eliáš
 1957–1960 Josef Drmola
 1960–1970 František Řeháček
 1970–1986 Jan Tencian
 1986–1989 Josef Votoček
 1989–1990 Břetislav Baran
 1990–1994 Milan Hořínek
 1994–1998 Ivan Kosatík
 1998–2006 Martin Tesařík
 2006–2014 Martin Novotný
 2014 Martin Major
 2014–2018 Antonín Staněk
 2018–     Miroslav Žbánek

Twin towns – sister cities

Olomouc is twinned with:

 Antony, France
 Kraków, Poland
 Kunming, China
 Lucerne, Switzerland
 Makarska, Croatia
 Nördlingen, Germany
 Old Town (Bratislava), Slovakia
 Owensboro, United States
 Pécs, Hungary
 Subotica, Serbia
 Tampere, Finland
 Veenendaal, Netherlands

Gallery

Panorama

See also
 Academia Film Olomouc
 List of bishops and archbishops of Olomouc

References

External links

Portal Olomouc
UNESCO World Heritage Site: Holy Trinity Column
Palacký University
Moravian college
Filmmaker Albert Maysles in Olomouc

Webcams
Olomouc town hall with an astronomical clock
Horní Square with the Holy Trinity Column

Tourism
Official portal for tourist – information, services, leisure time, monuments, culture
Travel Information and Photos of the Main Sights in Olomouc
Olomouc Travel.cz

 
Populated places in Olomouc District
Margraviate of Moravia
Holocaust locations in Czechoslovakia